The women's doubles tournament of the 2011 BWF World Championships (World Badminton Championships) was held from August 8 to 14. Du Jing and Yu Yang were the defending champions.
Wang Xiaoli and Yu Yang defeated Tian Qing and Zhao Yunlei 22–20, 21–11 in the final to win their first gold medals at the World Championships.

Seeds

  Wang Xiaoli / Yu Yang (champions)
  Cheng Wen-hsing / Chien Yu-chin (second round)
  Miyuki Maeda / Satoko Suetsuna (semifinals)
  Mizuki Fujii / Reika Kakiiwa (quarterfinals)
  Tian Qing / Zhao Yunlei (final)
  Ha Jung-eun / Kim Min-jung (second round, retired)
  Shizuka Matsuo / Mami Naito (quarterfinals)
  Meiliana Jauhari / Greysia Polii (quarterfinals)
  Duanganong Aroonkesorn / Kunchala Voravichitchaikul (third round)
  Valeria Sorokina / Nina Vislova (third round)
  Poon Lok Yan / Tse Ying Suet (third round)
  Vita Marissa / Nadya Melati (quarterfinals)
  Lotte Jonathans / Paulien van Dooremalen (second round)
  Christinna Pedersen / Kamilla Rytter Juhl (third round)
  Misaki Matsutomo / Ayaka Takahashi (third round)
  Shinta Mulia Sari / Yao Lei (third round)

Draw

Finals

Section 1

Section 2

Section 3

Section 4

References
Main Draw

2011 BWF World Championships
BWF